The 16th Tejano Music Awards were held in 1996. They recognized accomplishments by musicians from the previous year. The Tejano Music Awards is an annual awards ceremony recognizing Tejano music musicians.

Award winners

Vocalists of The Year 
Male Vocalist of The Year
Emilio Navaira
Female Vocalist of The Year
Selena

Vocal Duo Of the Year 
Emilio & Raul Navaira

Albums of the Year 
Orchestra (Solo Para Ti by Mazz)
Progressive (Sound Life by Emilio Navaira)
Traditional (Cruz De Madera by Michael Salgado)
Overall (Dreaming of You by Selena)

Songs of The Year 
Song of The Year
Tu Solo Tu by Selena
Tejano Crossover
I Could Fall in Love by Selena
Tejano Country Song of The Year
It's Not the End of the World by Emilio Navaira
Instrumental of the Year
David Lee's Favorites by David Lee Garza y Los Musicales

Entertainers of the Year 
Male Entertainer of The Year
Emilio Navaira
Female Entertainer of The Year
Selena

Most Promising Band of The Year 
Pete Astudillo

See also 
Tejano Music Awards

References 

Tejano Music Awards by year
Tejano Music Awards
Tejano Music Awards
Tejano Music Awards